The Alacalufan languages or Kawesqaran languages are a small language family of South America. They have not been definitely linked to any other American language family.

Languages
Early vocabularies show that Alakaluf was three languages, with an extinct Southern Alakaluf (vocabularies in Fitz-Roy 1839 and Hyades & Deniker 1891) and Central Alakaluf (vocabularies in Borgatello 1928, Marcel 1892, and Skottsberg 1913) in addition to the critically endangered northern variety, Kawésqar.

Based on alleged toponymic evidence, a purported Kakauhua language has sometimes been included in the Alacalufan family.

Guaicaro may have been a dialect of Central Alakaluf or Kawesqar.

Mason (1950)
Mason (1950) lists:

Caucawe (Kaukahue, etc.)
Enoo (Peshera)
Lecheyel
Yekinawe (Yequinahuere, etc.)
Adwipliin
Alikulip, Alakaluf, etc.
Calen
Taijatof

Chono, Caraica (Karaika), and Poya may also belong.

Vocabulary
Loukotka (1968) lists the following basic vocabulary items.

{| class="wikitable"
! gloss !! Northern Alcaluf !! Southern Alcaluf !! Kaueskar
|-
! tongue
| lekél || paileaf || kalaktás
|-
! hand
| palkár || yukebe || terwá
|-
! water
| karkasa || arrét || chfalai
|-
! moon
| dzyakapés || yakapech || kapánuk
|-
! dog
| salki || shalki || kyurro
|-
! fish
| xawoel || orol || keuwako
|-
! canoe
| peler || cherru || kaief
|}

References 

 
Language families
Languages of Chile